Posht-e Par (also Romanized as Posht Par; also known as Posht Bar) is a village in Maharlu Rural District, Kuhenjan District, Sarvestan County, Fars Province, Iran. At the 2006 census, its population was 528, in 132 families.

References 

Populated places in Sarvestan County